Cale Boyter is an American film producer. He was nominated for an Academy Award in the category Best Picture for the film Dune.

Selected filmography 
 Dumb and Dumberer: When Harry Met Lloyd (2003)
 Elf (2003)
 The Butterfly Effect (2004)
 Blade: Trinity (2004)
 A History of Violence (2005)
 Wedding Crashers (2005)
 Just Friends (2005)
 Grilled (2006)
 How to Eat Fried Worms (2006)
 Tenacious D in The Pick of Destiny (2006)
 Shoot 'Em Up (2007)
 Semi-Pro (2008)
 Journey to the Center of the Earth (2008)
 Pride and Glory (2008)
 Ghosts of Girlfriends Past (2009)
 Noah (2014)
 The SpongeBob Movie: Sponge Out of Water (2015)
 Monster Trucks (2016)
 Same Kind of Different as Me (2017)
 Pacific Rim: Uprising (2018)
 Detective Pikachu (2019)
 Dune (2021; co-nominated with Mary Parent and Denis Villeneuve)
 Dune: Part Two (2023)

References

External links 

Living people
Year of birth missing (living people)
Place of birth missing (living people)
American film producers